Maria Ntanou (born 3 March 1990) is a Greek cross-country skier, Olympian who has competed since 2007. She was an Athlete Role Model of 2020 Winter Youth Olympics. Ntanou has represented her country, Greece, in three Winter Olympic Games, and she was the flag bearer at the Opening Ceremony of the Beijing 2022 Winter Olympic Games.

Career 
Ntanou finished 72nd in the 10 km event at the 2010 Winter Olympics in Vancouver. She took 76th place with +6:03.6 from the Norwegian Olympic Champion Ragnhild Haga at the 2018 Winter Olympics in Pyeongchang, which is the best result for Greece in this discipline. In 2022 Beijing Winter Olympics, Ntanou competed in four disciplines: sprint, 10km classic, team sprint and 30km.

At the FIS Nordic World Ski Championships 2009 in Liberec, she finished 82nd in the individual sprint while being lapped in the 15 km pursuit event.
At the FIS Nordic World Ski Championships 2017 in Lahti, she finished 8th in the 5 km qualification classic race. She also won the overall Greek national cup series in 2019.

At the FIS Nordic World Ski Championships 2021 in Oberstdorf, Ntanou raced in four disciplines: sprint, skiathlon, 10 km free technique and team sprint.

Olympic Winter Games results

FIS Nordic World Ski Championships results

FIS Balkan Cup results 
Ntanou won a bronze medal in the overall ranking of the FIS Balkan Cup series in 2017 and 2018.

Greek National Championships results

Personal life 
Ntanou grew up in Naousa, a town in the northern part of Greece with great tradition in winter sports. She studied Economic Science at the Aristotle University of Thessaloniki and graduated in 2012. At the age of 23, Ntanou moved to Lausanne to study Sport Administration and Technology (AISTS) at École Polytechnique Fédérale de Lausanne.

References
Sports Reference

1990 births
Living people
Greek female cross-country skiers
Olympic cross-country skiers of Greece
Cross-country skiers at the 2010 Winter Olympics
Cross-country skiers at the 2018 Winter Olympics
Cross-country skiers at the 2022 Winter Olympics
Sportspeople from Veria